Robert Caldwell was an English footballer who played as a centre forward for South Kirkby, Doncaster Rovers and Bristol City.

Playing career
Caldwell began his football career at South Kirkby in the Sheffield Association before moving to Doncaster Rovers in August 1933. In May 1936 he moved to Bristol City.

References

Date of birth missing
Date of death missing
English footballers
Association football forwards
English Football League players
South Kirkby Colliery F.C. players
Doncaster Rovers F.C. players
Bristol City F.C. players
Footballers from Yorkshire
1909 births